Fire! Live at the Village Vanguard is a live album by saxophonist David Newman's Quintet, with guest appearances by Stanley Turrentine and Hank Crawford, recorded at the Village Vanguard in 1988 and released on the Atlantic label.

Reception

In his review for AllMusic, Scott Yanow called it: "An enjoyable set of soulful, straight-ahead jazz.".

Track listing 
 "Old Devil Moon" (Burton Lane, E.Y. "Yip" Harburg) – 7:46
 "Chenya" (David "Fathead" Newman) – 8:33
 "Slippin' Down" (David Leonhardt) – 6:53
 "Wide Open Spaces" (Babs Gonzales) – 7:34
 "Lonely Avenue" (Doc Pomus) – 7:48
 "Filthy McNasty" (Horace Silver) – 7:21
 "Blues for Ball" (McCoy Tyner) – 12:34 Additional track on CD release
 "Hard Times" (Paul Mitchell) – 9:25 Additional track on CD release

Personnel 
David Newman – tenor saxophone, flute
Stanley Turrentine – tenor saxophone (tracks 2-4)
Hank Crawford – alto saxophone (tracks 2, 3, 5 & 8)
Steve Nelson – vibraphone
Kirk Lightsey – piano
David Williams - bass
Marvin "Smitty" Smith – drums

References 

David "Fathead" Newman live albums
1989 live albums
Atlantic Records live albums
Albums produced by Bob Porter (record producer)
Albums recorded at the Village Vanguard